Goran Kopunović (born 1 February 1967) is a Serbian football manager and former player.

Career
Kopunović played for OFK Kikinda in the Yugoslav Second League between 1988 and 1991, before returning to his childhood club Spartak Subotica for the 1991–92 Yugoslav First League. He subsequently moved abroad and played in Spain (Figueres), Hungary (Ferencváros and Újpest), Cyprus (AEK Larnaca), and Germany (FSV Zwickau and TGM SV Jügesheim).

After hanging up his boots, Kopunović worked as manager in Hungary, Rwanda, and Tanzania.

Personal life
Kopunović is the older brother of fellow footballer Velibor Kopunović.

Honours
Ferencváros
 Nemzeti Bajnokság I: 1994–95, 1995–96
 Magyar Kupa: 1994–95
Újpest
 Nemzeti Bajnokság I: 1997–98

References

External links
 
 
 
 Goran Kopunović Interview

AEK Larnaca FC players
Association football forwards
BFC Siófok managers
Cypriot First Division players
Expatriate football managers in Hungary
Expatriate football managers in Rwanda
Expatriate football managers in Tanzania
Expatriate footballers in Cyprus
Expatriate footballers in Germany
Expatriate footballers in Hungary
Expatriate footballers in Spain
Ferencvárosi TC footballers
FK Spartak Subotica players
FSV Zwickau players
Nemzeti Bajnokság I players
OFK Kikinda players
Segunda División players
Serbia and Montenegro expatriate footballers
Serbia and Montenegro expatriate sportspeople in Cyprus
Serbia and Montenegro expatriate sportspeople in Germany
Serbia and Montenegro expatriate sportspeople in Hungary
Serbia and Montenegro expatriate sportspeople in Spain
Serbia and Montenegro footballers
Serbian expatriate football managers
Serbian football managers
Serbian footballers
Simba S.C. managers
Sportspeople from Subotica
TGM SV Jügesheim players
UE Figueres footballers
Újpest FC players
Yugoslav First League players
Yugoslav footballers
1967 births
Living people